Palakurthi Assembly constituency is a constituency of Telangana Legislative Assembly, India.It is part of Warangal Lok Sabha constituency. The constituency was created mainly from Chennur assembly constituency during the reorganization in 2009. The constituency spans across three districts i.e., Warangal rural, Jangaon and Mahabubabad.

Mandals
The Assembly Constituency presently comprises the following Mandals. The mandals fall in three different districts i.e., Warangal rural, Jangaon and Mahabubabad.

Members of Legislative Assembly

Election results

Telangana Legislative Assembly election, 2018

Telangana Legislative Assembly election, 2014

Telangana Legislative Assembly election, 2009

See also
 List of constituencies of Telangana Legislative Assembly

References

Assembly constituencies of Telangana
Hanamkonda district